Sar Korreh (also Romanized as Sarkorreh; also known as Sar Kūreh and Sarkurreh) is a village in Howmeh Rural District, in the Central District of Dashtestan County, Bushehr Province, Iran. At the 2006 census, its population was 1,789, in 379 families.

References 

Populated places in Dashtestan County